Lokaltog A/S is a Danish railway company responsible for train operation and related passenger services on nine local railways on the islands of Zealand, Lolland and Falster in Denmark. The company was formed on 1 July 2015 as a merger of Lokalbanen A/S and Regionstog A/S. Movia owns a part of Lokaltog, whereas buses are owned by companies, subcontractors, that are paid by this transit agency to drive according to contract.

Railway lines

The numbers are for the table only. There are no official train line numbers for these trains. However 1-4 are railways located at North Zealand , number 5 in the table, is an urban line in the Northernmost of Copenhagen. Number 6-9 are railways located south of or west of the Danish Capital city.

Rolling stock

See also
 Rail transport in Denmark

References

External links
 
 company website (Danish language)

Railway companies of Denmark
Companies based in Hillerød Municipality
Railway companies established in 2015
2015 establishments in Denmark